Donde Te Encuentro is Kari Jobe's second Spanish language album. Donde Te Encuentro is the Spanish version of the album Where I Find You released on January 24, 2012. This album was released on April 24, 2012 by Sparrow Records label. The album debuted at chart No. 6 on the Latin Pop Albums and on the chart No. 19 on the Top Latin Albums by Billboard.

Critical reception

Awarding the album with three stars out of five, Andree Farias from Allmusic's said "Jobe herself enunciates properly and sings with pathos, doing justice to songs that sound wonderful if one's first language isn't español, but that otherwise may raise eyebrows among hardcore Latin gospel listeners." A staff editor at Amazon.com gave the album a relatively positive review, writing, "Donde Te Encuentro (Where I Find You) features all 12 powerful songs from Where I Find You recorded entirely in Spanish including the current hit radio single, We Are, that Kari describes as a song of commission for us as believers to be reminded of what we ve been called to and that is to impact people s lives in everything we do."

Track listing

NOTE:  These songs are Spanish-language translations of Kari Jobe songs in English.  The original English-language song is listed next to each title.

Chart performance

References

2012 albums
Kari Jobe albums
Spanish-language albums
Sparrow Records albums
Albums produced by Matt Bronleewe